Michael Hall (born 20 July 1975) is a British Paralympic archer.

He has competed at the Summer Paralympics, World Para Archery Championships and the Para Continental Championships.

References

Paralympic archers of Great Britain
Archers at the 2016 Summer Paralympics
Living people
English male archers
1975 births